Group III was split into two sub-groups.  One tournament was held in Algiers, Algeria, February 3–7, while the other was held in Jurmala, Latvia,  June 11–15.  Both were played on outdoor clay courts.

Format
The eight teams in each sub-group were split into two pools and played in a round-robin format. The top two teams of each pool advanced to the promotion pool, from which the two top teams were promoted to the Europe/Africa Zone Group II in 2004. The bottom two teams of each group were placed in the relegation pool, from which the two bottom teams were demoted to the Europe/Africa Zone Group IV in 2004.

Algiers Half

Pool A

Results of Individual Ties

Pool B

Results of Individual Ties

Promotion pool
The top two teams from each of Pools A and B advanced to the Promotion pool. Results and points from games against the opponent from the preliminary round were carried forward.

Results of Individual Ties

Algeria and Hungary promoted to Group II for 2004.

Relegation pool
The bottom two teams from Pools A and B were placed in the relegation group.  Results and points from games against the opponent from the preliminary round were carried forward.

Results of Individual Ties

Angola and Armenia demoted to Group IV for 2004.

Jurmala Half

Pool A

Results of Individual Ties

Pool B

Results of Individual Ties

Promotion pool
The top two teams from each of Pools A and B advanced to the Promotion pool. Results and points from games against the opponent from the preliminary round were carried forward.

Results of Individual Ties

Georgia and Latvia promoted to Group II for 2004.

Relegation pool
The bottom two teams from Pools A and B were placed in the relegation group.  Results and points from games against the opponent from the preliminary round were carried forward.

Results of Individual Ties

Moldova and Bosnia/Herzegovina demoted to Group IV for 2004.

References

2003 Davis Cup Europe/Africa Zone
Davis Cup Europe/Africa Zone